Fabrik is a visual programming integrated development environment implemented in Smalltalk and designed at Apple Computer by Dan Ingalls, Scott Wallace, Yu-Ying Chow, Frank Ludolph, Ken Doyle and others during the mid-1980s. It consists of a kit of computational and graphic user interface components that can be "wired" together to build new components and useful applications.

External links
Fabrik - A Visual Programming Environment
Fabrik History
Fabrik Fabrik entry from the Squeak Swiki

Visual programming languages